The Sunshine Coast is a geographic subregion of the British Columbia Coast that generally comprises the regional districts of qathet and Sunshine Coast.

While populous and frequently visited by tourists, the Sunshine Coast can be reached only by ferry (commonly BC Ferries) or by floatplane, as no access roads have been built around or across the fjords separating it from the rest of the province.

Geography
The Sunshine Coast is a subregion of the mainland coast of British Columbia. It is bound by Howe Sound to the southeast, Desolation Sound to the northwest, the Pacific Ranges to the northeast, and the Strait of Georgia to the southwest. The region is bisected by Jervis Inlet. The region features a coastal lowland that gradually transitions to steep-sided mountains as you move toward the northeast.

The major islands of the Sunshine Coast include Anvil Island, Gambier Island, Goat Island, Hernando Island, Keats Island, Savary Island, and most of the Northern Gulf Islands.

Ecology
The Coast's wildlife includes cougars, black bears, wolves, marbled murrelet, orcas, great blue herons, seals, sea lions and bald eagles.  There are also abundant tide pools with a variety of molluscs, sea anemones and fish. 

At certain times of the year, seal pups may be encountered on the Coast's beaches. They should not be approached, as the mother may abandon them. All wildlife on the Coast should be viewed from a safe and respectful distance.

Climate
The lowlands have a warm-summer Mediterranean climate (Köppen: Csb) with warm, dry summers and cool, wet winters. Higher elevations feature a marine west coast climate (Köppen: Cfb) with warm summers, mild winters, and moderate rainfall throughout the year.

Demographics
As of the 2016 census, the population of the Sunshine Coast totals 50,040:
 29,970 in the Sunshine Coast Regional District
 20,070 in qathet Regional District

Major communities
The major communities of the Sunshine Coast are as follows:
Powell River (pop. 13,157)
Sechelt (pop. 10,200)
Gibsons (pop. 4,605)
Roberts Creek (pop. 3,421)

Economy
Historically, the economy of the Sunshine Coast was driven primarily by industries such as logging and mining.

Today, forestry and tourism form much of the local economy.

Culture
The Sunshine Coast is home to more artists per capita than any other Canadian region. Purple flags along the Sunshine Coast Highway and local streets indicate artists's studios where the public is welcome, and which feature many disciplines including painting, pottery and glassblowing.

Transportation
Due to its mountainous terrain, the Sunshine Coast is not directly linked over land to the surrounding coast. Instead, BC Ferries provides ferry service linking the coast to surrounding regions. Notable lines include Horseshoe Bay-Langdale, Little River-Westview, and Earls Cove-Saltery Bay. Minor ferry operators and water taxis provide service to minor islands dotting the strait.

The region is served by British Columbia Highway 101, which runs along the coast between the communities of Langdale and Lund.

Attractions
Some attractions specific to the Sunshine Coast include:
 Copeland Islands Marine Provincial Park
 Desolation Sound Marine Provincial Park
 Hidden Grove/Sechelt Heritage Forest
 Skookumchuck Narrows Provincial Park
 Smuggler Cove Marine Provincial Park
 Tems Swiya Museum - heritage museum showcasing the history and culture of the Shishalh people.
 The northern terminus of Highway 101, which is located in the town of Lund.

The region also features two notable trails:
 Powell Forest Canoe Route - a  canoeing route through various lakes north of Powell River

See also
Lower Mainland
Sea-to-Sky Corridor

References

External links

 Sunshine Coast, British Columbia, Canada Tourism Information Website
 Sunshine Coast Regional District
 
 Sunshine Coast Trail Maps

 
Sunshine Coast Regional District